Takeya (written: 偉弥, 健次, 剛也) is a masculine Japanese given name. Notable people with the name include:

 (born 1942), Japanese sumo wrestler
 (born 1983), Japanese mixed martial artist
 (born 1983), Japanese baseball player

Takeya (written: 竹谷, 竹屋 or 武谷) is also a Japanese surname. Notable people with the surname include:

, Japanese physician
Makoto Takeya (born 1977), Japanese footballer
 (born 1980), Japanese sprint canoeist
 (born 1969), Japanese politician

Japanese-language surnames
Japanese masculine given names